Taty Mbungu is a former international football player for Zaire. He participated in the 1974 Africa Cup of Nations competition. As late as 1985, Taty Mbungu was still playing for Zaire, appearing in a 1986 African Cup of Nations qualifying match versus the Republic of the Congo in Brazzaville.

He also featured in a documentary to commemorate the victory. 

In 2006, he was temporarily the sporting director of AS Vita Club.

References

External links

Footballers from Kinshasa
Democratic Republic of the Congo footballers
Democratic Republic of the Congo international footballers
Africa Cup of Nations-winning players
1974 African Cup of Nations players
AS Vita Club players
Association football midfielders